Astragalus dactylocarpus is a species of milkvetch in the family Fabaceae.

References

dactylocarpus
Taxa named by Pierre Edmond Boissier